Bourbonais is a former settlement in Bureau County, Illinois, United States. Bourbonais was located in Concord Township, along the Burlington railroad line southwest of Wyanet and northeast of Buda. It was platted in 1864. It was named for a man of mixed French and Native American ancestry who had settled in this general area in 1820.

References

Geography of Bureau County, Illinois
Ghost towns in Illinois
1864 establishments in Illinois